Égletons is a railway station in Égletons, Nouvelle-Aquitaine, France. The station is located on the Tulle - Meymac railway line. The station is served by Intercités (long distance) and TER (local) services operated by the SNCF.

Train services

The station is served by regional trains towards Bordeaux, Brive-la-Gaillarde and Ussel.

References

Railway stations in Corrèze